is a Japanese manga series written and illustrated by Minoru Furuya. It was serialized in Kodansha's seinen manga magazine Weekly Young Magazine from June 2008 to February 2010, with its chapters collected in six tankōbon volumes. It was adapted into a live action film that premiered in Japan in 2016.

Plot
The series follows the parallel storylines of two former classmates, Susumu Okada and Shoichi Morita, as they diverge into wildly different lives and characters. While the hopeless Okada finds himself in a stereotypical a love story relationship and making ends meet working at a cleaning company; Shoichi drifts further into darkness, traumatized by his childhood, and becomes a serial killer. Susumu Okada (25 years old, virgin) who works for a cleaning company, feels vague anxiety due to his mundane life. At one point, Okada becomes friends with Yuji Ando (31 years old, virgin), a senior who works in the same company. Ando confides to Okada that he is in love with Yuka Abe, a coffee shop clerk near her workplace. Okada, is taken by Ando to a cafe, and happens to meet his high school classmate Shoichi Morita again. Soon Okada and Ando are consulted by Yuka, who informs them that she has been stalked by Morita. For a while however, Yuka does not feel Morita's presence around her. During that time Okada gets along with Yuka, and Ando, who is indignant at it, overcomes his broken hearts and gets in a relationship with Ryoko Oda, a gym instructor. However, Morita's obsession with Yuka has not disappeared. Morita is revealed to be a psychopath, who feels sadistic pleasure when murdering people.

As a teenager, he kidnapped and strangled his high school bully, Kawashima. This event changed Morita forever, who then began to have strong sexual fantasies in which he strangled women to death, and, in order to relive the sexual pleasure he felt that moment, he is targeting Yuka. He gradually approaches her, committing several murders along the way. At one point, Okada learns that Morita is aiming for their lives. Yuka and him quit their jobs and move to escape the threat of the serial killer. Meanwhile, the police become desperate trying to stop Morita, who has become increasingly erratic. Morita oscillates between carrying out Yuka's strangulation plan and killing himself. After failing to murder Yuka and having lit his house on fire in a fit of madness, Morita is on the run from the police. Exhausted, he begins to wander in solitude and falls asleep on a park bench. He has a dream, in which he sees himself as a disabled person, with his brain being visible. 

He notices that the right side of his brain and his frontal lobe are missing. Morita goes to an dreamlike hospital in order to treat his illness. Asking an imaginary surgeon to fix his brain, he confesses that he wishes to be a "normal" person over anything else in this world, but to his horror, the doctor answers that he cannot do anything about it. A vivid memory plays in his eyes: As a young teenager, on his way home from junior highschool, Morita realized that he was not a "normal" person, and that he was  different from the people around him. Morita, who understood he was mentally ill, was in such despair, that he crouched on the floor and cried in silence for hours, wishing to die and to be forgotten. Suddenly, a policeman calls him out while he was sleeping in the park. Tears flow from Morita's eyes as he gets up.

Media

Manga
Written and illustrated by Minoru Furuya, Himeanole was serialized in Kodansha's seinen manga magazine Weekly Young Magazine from June 2, 2008, to February 22, 2010. Kodansha collected its chapters in six tankōbon volumes, released from November 6, 2008, to April 6, 2010.

Volume list

Film

A live action film adaptation premiered in Japan on May 28, 2016.

Reception
The six volumes of Himeanole were featured on Oricon's weekly chart of the best-selling manga; volume 1 sold 49,371 copies in its first two weeks; volume 2 sold 54,058 copies in its first two weeks; volume 3 sold 55,151 in its first two weeks; volume 4 sold 41,500 copies in its first week; volume 5 sold 48,215 copies in its first two weeks; and volume 6 sold 40,935 copies in its first week.

References

External links

Kodansha manga
Seinen manga